Thrigun (formerly known as Adith Arun) is an Indian actor who has appeared in Tamil and Telugu language films.

Early life
Thrigun was born as the only son to his parents and did his schooling in Vizag and pursued journalism in Madras Christian College. Before moving into theatre, he did several short films and over twenty shows at a semi-professional level, including shows for Madras Players and Boardwalkers.

Career
Thrigun met Prakash Raj during an audition for Inidhu Inidhu, the Tamil version of the 2007 Telugu film Happy Days, which Prakash Raj had been producing. Through Prakash Raj he was able to meet other producers and was signed on to play the male protagonist in the 2009 Telugu thriller film Katha. The film also featured Genelia D'Souza and won critical acclaim upon release, with a critic noting that he made a "fairly competent" debut. In 2010, he was signed by Narayan Nagendra Rao to star in Maalai Pozhudhin Mayakathilaey alongside Regina Cassandra, his co-star in the short film Kadhalil Sodhappuvadhu Eppadi. However, the pair was replaced by Aari and Shubha Phutela after a delay in production. Inidhu Inidhu released only in 2010 and was a box office failure with very little publicity during release, and his next Tamil film Theneer Viduthi (2011) faced a similar response.

His next release in Telugu was Weekend Love in 2014 which was a disaster garnering lukewarm response. His much anticipated Telugu film Tungabhadra produced by Sai Korrapati was released in March 2015 and sunk without a trace despite earning him positive reviews. In 2017, he starred in Yupp TV Web Series Mana Mugguri Love Story, alongside Telugu stars Navdeep and Tejaswi Madivada. The series received positive response and was a success.

Filmography

Films

Web series

References

External links
 

Living people
Male actors from Chennai
Male actors in Tamil cinema
Indian male film actors
21st-century Indian male actors
Year of birth missing (living people)
Male actors in Telugu cinema